Whalers is an 1845 painting by British artist J. M. W. Turner. Done in oil on canvas, the work depicts a whaling ship and her launches pursuing a whale. Originally created with the hope that collector Elhanan Bicknell would purchase it, the work is currently found in the collection of the Metropolitan Museum of Art.

The painting depicts a wounded sperm whale thrashing in a sea of foam and blood. In the background is a ghostly three-masted whaling vessel.

References 

1845 paintings
Paintings in the collection of the Metropolitan Museum of Art
Paintings by J. M. W. Turner
Maritime paintings
Whales in art